Sundown High School is a public high school located in Sundown, Texas (USA) and classified as a 2A school by the UIL. It is part of the Sundown Independent School District located in southern Hockley County. The school is widely recognized for its stellar academics, great cross country program, and, like most small Texas towns, its football team. In 2017–2018, the school won the UIL Lone Star Cup for 2A.

Athletics

The Sundown Roughnecks compete in the following sports:

Baseball
Basketball
Cross Country
Football
Golf
Powerlifting
Softball
Tennis
Track and Field

State titles 
Girls' Basketball 
1961(1A)
1962(1A)
1963(1A)
Boys' Cross Country 
1988(1A)
1989(1A)
1990(2A)
1992(2A)
1994(2A)
1995(2A)
2005(1A)
2007(1A)
2010(1A)
2016(2A)
Girls' Cross Country 
2005(1A)
2006(1A)
2014(2A)
2016(2A)
Girls' Golf 
1983(1A)

Band
As of 2021, the Sundown High School marching band holds records at the UIL State Marching Band Competition for most total appearances (26) and most finals appearances (24).
Marching Band State Champions 
1987(1A)
1988(1A)
1989(1A)
2003(1A)^
2005(1A)
2009(1A)
2011(1A)
^were co-champion with Throckmorton High School

References

External links
Sundown ISD

Schools in Hockley County, Texas
Public high schools in Texas